Dyfi may also refer to:

 The River Dyfi in Wales
The Dyfi Estuary Mudflats in Wales
The Dyfi Furnace in Wales
Dyfi Junction in Wales
The Dyfi National Nature Reserve in Wales
The Dyfi Valley Way in Wales
 The Democratic Youth Federation of India
Don't You Fake It, an album by The Red Jumpsuit Apparatus.